Vishka Suqeh (also Romanized as Vīshkā Sūqeh; also known as Vīshgāh, Vīshkāh Sūqeh, Vishka Shoogheh, Vīshkā Sūqeh, and Vishke) is a village in Howmeh Rural District, in the Central District of Rasht County, Gilan Province, Iran. At the 2006 census, its population was 723, in 207 families.

References 

Populated places in Rasht County